Paul Beulque (29 April 1877 – 1 November 1943) was a French water polo player. He competed in the men's tournament at the 1912 Summer Olympics.

References

Point d'inspiration du Film de l'artiste Isabella Hin
https://panorama23.lefresnoy.net/artwork/1869/fight-or-flight/isabella-hin

1877 births
1943 deaths
French male water polo players
Olympic water polo players of France
Water polo players at the 1912 Summer Olympics
Sportspeople from Tourcoing